Amerila omissa is a moth of the subfamily Arctiinae first described by Walter Rothschild in 1910. It is found from the north-eastern parts of the Himalayas, through China and Malaysia to Borneo.

On Mount Kinabalu the species can be found as high as 2600 m above sea level but is mainly found in the lower alpine regions around 1000 m above sea level.

References

Amerilini
Moths of Asia
Moths described in 1910